Jamil Mahammad oglu Ahmadov (1924 – 2 September 1944) was an Azerbaijani Red Army lieutenant and a Hero of the Soviet Union. Ahmadov was posthumously awarded the title on 24 March 1945 for his actions in Operation Bagration. Ahmadov reportedly continued to command his platoon while wounded and died of his wounds.

Early life 
Ahmadov was born in 1924 in Jabrayil in the family of a servant. He received secondary education before the war.

World War II 
Ahmadov was drafted into the Red Army in March 1942. He graduated from the Ordzhonikidze Infantry School in 1943 and became a platoon commander in the 168th Guards Rifle Regiment of the 55th Guards Rifle Division. He entered into combat in fall 1943 in the North Caucasus. During battles in Ukraine Ahmadov received the Order of the Red Star for his actions.

During the summer of 1944 Ahmedov fought in Operation Bagration. On 23 June, his platoon and three others reportedly ambushed and destroyed a column of German infantry. On 24 June during the storming of German fortifications near Parichi village, Ahmedov reportedly killed more than ten German soldiers in a trench. He was wounded but continued to lead the platoon. On 25 June, his platoon crossed the Tremlia ahead of the main forces. The platoon reportedly supported the crossing with its fire for ten hours. Ahmadov was wounded a second time and reportedly refused to leave the battlefield. On 26 June during the attack on the village of Malyn Ahmadov was wounded in the thigh. He reportedly was carried from the battlefield when he lost consciousness from blood loss. He was awarded the Order of Alexander Nevsky on 27 July. On 2 September, Ahmadov died of his wounds at Stare in Gmina Nieporęt.

On 24 March 1945, Ahmadov was awarded the title Hero of the Soviet Union and the Order of Lenin. He was buried in Warsaw in the cemetery of Soviet soldiers.

A street and a school in Jabrayil were named for Ahmadov. A bust of Ahmadov was also built.

References 

1924 births
1944 deaths
Heroes of the Soviet Union
Soviet military personnel killed in World War II
Recipients of the Order of Lenin
People from Jabrayil
Soviet military personnel of World War II from Azerbaijan